Juno Reactor is a multi-national musical and performing group, primarily based in Brighton, UK. Known for their cinematic fusion of electronic, global influences, and orchestral symphonic approach, collaborating with composer Don Davis and composing for the musical score of The Matrix (Reloaded and Revolutions). Central to the project is Ben Watkins and his collaborations with a constantly changing ensemble of musicians from across the world. This ensemble has included Mabi Thobejane, Amampondo, Steve Stevens, Eduardo Niebla, Greg Ellis, Taz Alexander, Sugizo, Budgie and recently Hamsika Iyer and Maggie Hikri.

History
Juno Reactor was formed as an art project in 1990. Ben Watkins wanted to collaborate with other artists, producing exciting projects that were not commercially driven. He wanted to create experimental music and non-musical soundtracks that would work with installations, art pieces, and film projects.

Juno Reactor released their first single, "Laughing Gas", in 1993 on the NovaMute label. This was soon followed by their debut album, Transmissions. This release was the first artist album in the genre. Later, the band released Luciana on Alex Paterson's (The Orb) Inter-Modo label. Juno Reactor left NovaMute and Inter-Modo in 1995 and signed with the UK label Blue Room Released to release the single "Guardian Angel". Their album Beyond the Infinite was released in 1995.

The 1997 Blue Room Released Bible of Dreams was Juno Reactor's fourth album. It had a very different sound from the group's previous albums, and moved away from the traditional dance beats by implementing tribal influences. Watkins collaborated with Amampondo, a traditional South African percussion act, on the single "Conga Fury". Watkins and Amampondo went on a five-week tour of the US, opening for Moby. In 1998, Juno Reactor played a live set with Amampondo at Glastonbury Festival. The group collaborated with The Creatures on the track "I'm here...Another Planet" for the Lost in Space (1998) soundtrack. They teamed up with The Creatures again in 1999 on the track "Exterminating Angel", featured on that group's album Anima Animus.

Watkins released the fifth Juno Reactor album, Shango, in 2000. It was the first of his albums on Metropolis Records. The first track from the album, "Pistolero", was a collaboration with Billy Idol's guitarist, Steve Stevens. The track was featured during the trailer for the movie Once Upon a Time in Mexico, as well as in the film itself. In the fall of 2002, Juno Reactor released a new single titled "Hotaka". It was recorded in a Japanese studio overlooking Mount Fuji. "Hotaka" featured Stevens on guitar, and included traditional Taiko drummers Gocoo. In 2003, the album Odyssey 1992–2002 was released as a compilation of the best Juno Reactor tracks of the decade.

The sixth Juno Reactor album, Labyrinth, was released in October 2004, and featured Watkins' work from the Matrix films. The album once again featured the tribal influences present in their music through tracks like "Conquistador II".

In 2006, Watkins was hired to compose an orchestral score for Brave Story, a Japanese anime feature film. Sony Japan released the soundtrack, which was recorded at the Slovak Radio Concert Hall in Slovakia with the Slovak National Symphony Orchestra. The album was written by "Ben Watkins aka Juno Reactor".

In 2008 Ben Watkins collaborated with anime director Koji Morimoto for Genius Party Beyond, an anthology of short animated films from Studio 4 °C.

Juno Reactor's album Gods & Monsters was released in March 2008, and featured the introduction of Ghetto Priest and Sugizo into the Juno Reactor fold, along with Eduardo Niebla, Xavier Morel, and Yasmin Levy. In 2009, the band toured with drummer Budgie, of the band Siouxsie and the Banshees.

Juno Reactor's album The Golden Sun of the Great East was released on Metropolis Records in 2013.

Juno Reactor & The Mutant Theatre premiered at the Ozora Festival 4 August 2016 "TIME" a unique performance featuring the Juno Reactor live band: Tal Tula Ben-Ari (Vocals) Nataly Hay (Dancer) Amir Haddad (Oud and Guitars) Ben Watkins (Electronics & Guitar) Johann Bley (Drums). Joined by Agnivo and Stigma Show, visual performance groups from Russia, under the banner of The Mutant Theatre.

The Mutant Theatre was released by Metropolis Records on 22 June 2018 and features tracks from the live show Juno Reactor & The Mutant Theatre. The first single from the album, Our World, was released on 30 June 2017.

In August 2018, Juno Reactor performed at the Hacker Conference, DEF CON. Along, on 10 August 2018, the single Dakota was released, written together with the Israeli DJ duo Undercover.

On 22 August 2019, the EP Into Valhalla was released on Metropolis Records (North America) and Blue Tunes Records (worldwide) featuring remixes by GMS and 3 of Life. Ben Watkins remixed the track Nukhta for Indian band Medieval Punditz which subsequently got released on their compilation on 30 August 2019.

Appearances in media

Movies and television
Juno Reactor produced and wrote Traci Lords' hit "Control". As an instrumental it featured on the soundtrack to the 1995 Mortal Kombat movie during the fight between Liu Kang and Reptile. The group also appeared on the soundtrack to the sequel, Mortal Kombat: Annihilation, with the track "Conga Fury".

In 1997, while on tour with Moby, Ben Watkins was requested to create the score for the original Japanese horror movie Ring but had to turn it down due to being mid-tour. Instead, two tracks, Guardian Angel and Feel the Universe were used on the soundtrack compilation stating "inspired by".

Later, Ben Watkins, in collaboration with Don Davis, worked with The Wachowskis for the Matrix series of films and video games. Juno Reactor's music was featured in five sequences from the middle two films in the franchise, including the highway chase (Mona Lisa Overdrive) and the Agent Smith fight (Burly Brawl) from The Matrix Reloaded and the subway train chase (The Trainman Cometh), the shootout on the Merovingian's club (Tetsujin) and the end credits (Navras) from The Matrix Revolutions. The Animatrix also featured pre-existing tracks "Masters of the Universe" (in Kid's Story) and "Conga Fury (Animatrix Remix)" (in Final Flight of the Osiris).

Brave Story saw Ben Watkins score his first full orchestra feature, released in Japan where it was the number 1 film for 6 weeks.

in 2001 "Masters of the Universe", from the album Shango, was briefly used in the Lara Croft: Tomb Raider movie trailer.

Many other tracks have been used in films including those listed below. Their single "Guardian Angel" was featured as the opening theme of the anime series Texhnolyze. "Guardian Angel" was also featured in the movie Drive, starring Mark Dacascos and Kadeem Hardison. Other Juno Reactor tracks appear on movies such as Eraser, Virtuosity, Lost in Space, the 1999 film Beowulf, and Once Upon a Time in Mexico. Juno Reactor soundtracks have also been played during baseball, basketball, and gridiron football games, and the Japanese Grand Prix. The track Feel the Universe is featured in the Kevin Phillips first movie, Super Dark Times.

Ben Watkins also worked on Bunraku released in the fall of 2011.

Video games
The video game Final Fantasy VII may have taken inspiration from the name of the band and used it to name an in-game location: The "Junon Underwater Reactor", a mako reactor. Their work appears in the PlayStation game Jet Moto 3, PlayStation 2's Frequency, PlayStation 2's Kinetica, PlayStation 2's Splashdown: Rides Gone Wild, and the Xbox game Mad Dash Racing. Juno Reactor also scored the PlayStation 2 game The Mark of Kri.

Juno Reactor also has a song in the game Dance Dance Revolution Ultramix 4. The trailer for Secuestro Express includes an excerpt from the song "War Dogs" from the album Labyrinth. Also from Labyrinth, the song "Mutant Message" is featured in the Legion trailer.

Gran Turismo commissioned Juno Reactor to create exclusive GT mixes of Alien and Return of the Pistolero for their global release of Gran Turismo Sport, both tracks appear on the 2018 album.

Discography

Full-length albums

 Transmissions (NovaMute Records 1993)
 Luciana (Inter-Modo 1994) (61-minute track originally recorded for the traveling art installation The Missile Project)
 Beyond the Infinite (Blue Room Released 1 October 1995)
 Bible of Dreams (Blue Room Released 1997)
 Shango (Metropolis Records 2000)
 Labyrinth (Metropolis Records, Universal Music 2004)
 Gods & Monsters (Metropolis Records 2008)
 The Golden Sun of the Great East (Metropolis Records, April 2013)
 The Mutant Theatre (Metropolis Records, 22 June 2018)

Singles and EPs

 Laughing Gas (1993)
 High Energy Protons (1994)
 Guardian Angel (1995)
 Samurai (1995)
 Conga Fury (1996)
 Jungle High (1997)
 God Is God (1997)
 GOD IS GOD!! (Front 242 Mixes) (1997)
 Pistolero (Blue Room Released 2000)
 Nitrogen (2000) – 2 tracks taken from Shango
 Masters of the Universe (2001)
 Hotaka (2002)
 The Zwara EP (2003)
 Song to the Siren (2009)
 Fear Not (with Laibach, 2009)
 Our World (Juno Reactor & The Mutant Theatre) (2017)
 Dakota (Juno Reactor & The Mutant Theatre) (2018)
Into Valhalla (2019)

Live recordings and compilation albums
 Odyssey 1992–2002
 Shango Tour 2001 Tokyo (Live in Tokyo) (2002)
 Juno Reactor Live – Audio Visual Experience (2007)
 Inside the Reactor (2012)
 The Golden Sun – Remixed (2015)

References

External links

 JunoReactor.com – Juno Reactor official website

TVT Records artists
English electronic music groups
English techno music groups
British trance music groups
Goa trance musicians
Mute Records artists
Musical groups from London
Musical groups established in 1990
British industrial music groups
Cyberpunk music
Metropolis Records artists